Vladislav Sergeyevich Kolesnikov (born July 27, 1984) is a Kazakhstani professional ice hockey defenceman who currently plays for Arlan Kokshetau of the Kazakhstan Hockey Championship (KAZ). He was a member of the Kazakhstan men's national ice hockey team at the 2012 IIHF World Championship.

References

External links

Living people
1984 births
Sportspeople from Oskemen
Kazakhstani ice hockey defencemen
Arlan Kokshetau players
Barys Nur-Sultan players
Kazzinc-Torpedo players
HC Lada Togliatti players
Traktor Chelyabinsk players